Palomas is a Spanish town in the province of Badajoz, Extremadura. It has a population of 703 (2007) and an area of 40.5 km².

Buildings 
 Nuestra Señora de Gracia Parish Church

References

External links 
 Official website 
 Profile 

Municipalities in the Province of Badajoz